Persatuan Sepakbola Indonesia Bone (simply known as Persibone) is an Indonesian football club based in Bone Regency, South Sulawesi. They currently compete in the Liga 3.

Honours
 Liga 3 South Sulawesi
 Runner-up: 2018

References

External links

Sport in South Sulawesi
Football clubs in Indonesia
Football clubs in South Sulawesi
Association football clubs established in 1980
1980 establishments in Indonesia